Jerusalem District No. 5 Schoolhouse is a historic one-room school building located at 3510 Old Jerusalem Rd, Wantagh, New York in Nassau County, New York. It is owned by Levittown Union Free School District #5. It was built in 1876 and enlarged to three rooms about 1920. It is a "T" shaped building with the original section located at the rear. It is a long frame building on a poured concrete foundation and hipped roof with shallow overhanging eaves. The main entrance features a portico. It is now leased out to a private day care facility.

It was listed on the National Register of Historic Places in 1996, and was also listed as a Town of Hempstead Historic Site.

References

Buildings and structures in Nassau County, New York
National Register of Historic Places in Nassau County, New York
One-room schoolhouses in New York (state)
School buildings completed in 1876
School buildings on the National Register of Historic Places in New York (state)